The Râul Alb is a left tributary of the river Dâmbovița in Romania. It discharges into the Dâmbovița in Lunca.

References

Rivers of Romania
Rivers of Dâmbovița County